Zbigniew Hnatio (18 March 1953 – 25 October 2014) was a Polish footballer. He played in one match for the Poland national football team in 1976.

References

External links
 

1953 births
2014 deaths
Polish footballers
Poland international footballers
Association football midfielders
Poland under-21 international footballers
Footballers from Kraków
Wisła Kraków players
MKS Cracovia (football) players
Stal Stalowa Wola players
Stal Mielec players